Kalabak, also known as Halabak is a mountain belonging to the Šar Mountains, located in Albania and Kosovo. Kalabak and its surroundings are treeless so it is an ideal places for shepherds to raise their sheep and the Šarplaninac as the protector.

Notes and references

Notes:

References:

Šar Mountains
Two-thousanders of Albania
Two-thousanders of Kosovo
International mountains of Europe
Albania–Kosovo border
Geography of Kukës County